The 2017 Ovo Energy Women's Tour was the fourth staging of The Women's Tour, a women's cycling stage race held in the United Kingdom. It ran from 7 to 11 June 2017, as part of the 2017 UCI Women's World Tour.

The race was won by Polish rider Katarzyna Niewiadoma, riding for the  team, who as a result, took the lead of the overall Women's World Tour standings. The podium was completed by 's Hannah Barnes.

Barnes moved onto the podium at the expense of Canada's Leah Kirchmann, after gaining twelve bonus seconds throughout the final stage; she also won the British rider classification as a result of this, having swapped the lead back-and-forth with sister Alice Barnes throughout the race. In the other classifications, Audrey Cordon of  held the lead of the mountains classification for the duration of the race, while Lucinda Brand was deemed the most combative rider of the race while  were the winners of the teams classification.

Teams
17 teams participated in the 2017 Women's Tour. The top 15 UCI Women's World tour teams were automatically invited, and obliged to attend the race.

Route

On 15 February the route for the race was revealed. The 2017 Tour began with a stage between Daventry and Kettering in Northamptonshire. The second stage featured Stoke-on-Trent and Staffordshire before a third stage between Atherstone and Leamington Spa. The fourth stage started and finished in Chesterfield before the final stage took place in London on the same  circuit that is used in the Tour of Britain.

Stages

Stage 1
7 June 2017 — Daventry to Kettering,

Stage 2
8 June 2017 — Stoke-on-Trent to Stoke-on-Trent,

Stage 3
9 June 2017 — Atherstone to Leamington Spa,

Stage 4
10 June 2017 — Chesterfield to Chesterfield,

Stage 5
11 June 2017 — London to London,

Classification leadership table

In the Women's Tour, five different jerseys were awarded. The most important was the general classification, which was calculated by adding each cyclist's finishing times on each stage. Time bonuses were awarded to the first three finishers on all stages: the stage winner won a ten-second bonus, with six and four seconds for the second and third riders respectively. Bonus seconds were also awarded to the first three riders at intermediate sprints; three seconds for the winner of the sprint, two seconds for the rider in second and one second for the rider in third. The rider with the least accumulated time is the race leader, identified by a green jersey. This classification was considered the most important of the 2017 Women's Tour, and the winner of the classification was considered the winner of the race.

Additionally, there was a points classification, which awarded a white jersey, with black, blue and pink trim. In the points classification, cyclists received points for finishing in the top 10 in a stage. For winning a stage, a rider earned 15 points, with 12 for second, 9 for third, 7 for fourth with a point fewer per place down to a single point for 10th place. There was also a sprints classification for the points awarded at intermediate sprints on each stage – awarded on a 3–2–1 scale – where the leadership of which was marked by a red jersey.

There was also a mountains classification, the leadership of which was marked by a predominantly black jersey. In the mountains classification, points towards the classification were won by reaching the top of a climb before other cyclists. Each climb was categorised as either first, second, or third-category, with more points available for the higher-categorised climbs. First-category climbs awarded the most points; the first ten riders were able to accrue points, compared with the first six on second-category climbs and the first four on third-category.

The fifth and final jersey represented the classification for British riders, marked by a light blue and pink jersey. This was decided the same way as the general classification, but only riders born in Great Britain were eligible to be ranked in the classification. There was also a team classification, in which the times of the best three cyclists per team on each stage were added together; the leading team at the end of the race was the team with the lowest total time.

See also
 2017 in women's road cycling

Notes

References

Sources

External links

2017 UCI Women's World Tour
2017 in women's road cycling
2017 in British women's sport
2017
June 2017 sports events in the United Kingdom